Vigneronia spieri is a species of corticolous (bark-dwelling), crustose lichen in the family Roccellaceae. It is found in the Galápagos Islands, mainland Ecuador and the Antilles (Curaçao).

Taxonomy
The lichen was first described scientifically by lichenologists André Aptroot and Laurens Sparrius in 2008, as a member of the genus Schismatomma. The lichen has also been recorded from Santa Cruz and Santiago islands. The species epithet honours Dutch lichenologist Leo Spier, who assisted the authors with thin-layer chromatography of lichen specimens. In 2014, following a large-scale phylogenetic revision of the Roccellaceae, Damien Ertz transferred the taxon to the newly circumscribed genus Vigneronia, in which it is the type species.

Description
The thallus, which lacks a cortex and measures up to 0.1 mm thick, is surrounded by a grey prothallus 2 mm wide. Vigneronia spieri has a  photobiont partner.

References

Roccellaceae
Lichen species
Lichens described in 2008
Lichens of Ecuador
Lichens of the Galápagos Islands
Taxa named by André Aptroot